Marmion Academy (formerly Marmion Military Academy) is a grade 9–12 Roman Catholic high school for boys in Aurora, Illinois, United States. It is in the Roman Catholic Diocese of Rockford.

The academy is owned and operated by the Benedictine monks of Marmion Abbey on campus. The academy is known for its three pillars: Spirituality, Academics and Leadership. The unique leadership formation programs include: Leadership Education and Development (LEAD) program and a United States Army Junior Reserve Officers' Training Corps (JROTC) program that has been a part of the academy since its early years, but was not a part of the school in the inaugural year of 1933–34.

The school is a part of the Chicago Catholic League.

History
Marmion Academy was founded in 1933 when the monks of St. Meinrad Abbey combined Jasper Academy (Jasper, Indiana) with the Fox Valley Catholic High School, which the Augustinians had just returned to the diocese of Rockford.  During the Great Depression era, it was difficult for students to pay their tuition as well as to buy uniforms, so the monks, in 1935, associated with the JROTC program and changed its name to Marmion Military Academy. At the time, all JROTC uniforms were provided for by the US government. In the 1990s, in order to provide more options for its student body and a return to the original spirit of the school, the monks of Marmion Abbey decided to make JROTC an optional program and to reinstitute the original name of the school, Marmion Academy. 

At one point, there were two campuses: one for residential students and one for day students. The two merged back into the Butterfield Road campus, which had been the residential campus.  In early 2002, the school decided to close its residential program and started to expand its student body.

In sports, the Marmion Cadets have been successful.  In 2000, the Marmion swim team captured the school's first state championship, along with a 3rd place in 1998, 2nd in 1999, and 3rd in 2001.  Later that decade, the 2010 Marmion Cadets placed 2nd in the state in the 6A State Championship for football and 3rd in the Cross Country Class 2A State Championships. In 2017, the Marmion Cadets baseball team finished 3rd in the 3A State Finals.  Just a year later, the Cadets captured their 2nd state championship in school history as the track and field team won the 2018 Class 2A State Championship.

Academics
Graduation Requirements:

Marmion requires that each graduate complete 4 credits each in English and Theology; 3 credits in Mathematics; 3 elective credits; 2 credits each in a Foreign Language (4 credits recommended), Science, Social Studies, and either Military Science (JROTC) or Leadership Education and Development (LEAD); and 1 credit each in Health/Physical Education; and ½ credit in Music and Art. Marmion students are required to perform at least 15 hours of community service each academic year.

At least 23¼ credits are required for graduation.

Leadership programs
Marmion has two leadership programs, LEAD (Leadership Education and Development) and JROTC (Junior Reserve Officer Training Corps). The LEAD program was started in 1994, while the JROTC has been a part of the school since 1935.

Notable alumni

Brad Childress, former NFL coach
Larry English, former NFL linebacker
Graham Glasgow, NFL offensive lineman (Denver Broncos)
Jordan Glasgow, NFL linebacker
Ryan Glasgow, former NFL defensive tackle
Valen Piotrowski, actor
Chick Hearn, former play-by-play announcer for the Los Angeles Lakers
Ben Kanute, triathlete who competed at the 2016 Summer Olympics
Chris Lauzen, former Illinois state senator, former Kane County Board chairman
James D. Oberweis, former Illinois state senator, owner of Oberweis Dairy
Ravi Singh, entrepreneur, author, politician
Daniel P. Ward, former Chief Justice of the Illinois Supreme Court

Notable staff
George Ireland is a former head basketball coach.  He later coached the Loyola University men's basketball team to the 1963 NCAA Championship.

References

External links
 

Roman Catholic Diocese of Rockford
Catholic secondary schools in Illinois
Boys' schools in the United States
Education in Aurora, Illinois
Educational institutions established in 1933
1933 establishments in Illinois
Benedictine secondary schools